Aparon are Filipino wafers drizzled with caramelized sugar and optionally, sesame seeds. They are uniquely made from unconsecrated hostia (communion wafers). They were first manufactured by a religious order who baked communion wafers for the Catholic Church, but needed a way to make use of extra and discarded wafers.

See also
Christmas wafer
Kiping
Barquillo

References 

Philippine cuisine
Flatbreads
Desserts